Konteradmiral Erich Bey (23 March 1898 – 26 December 1943) was a German admiral during World War II. He served as commander of the Kriegsmarine's destroyer forces and commanded the battleship Scharnhorst in the Battle of the North Cape on 26 December 1943, during which his ship was sunk and he was killed.

Career
Bey joined the Kaiserliche Marine on 13 June 1916 and served in its destroyer arm. Following the end of World War I, he stayed in the navy and continued his career with the rise of the Nazi Party in power in Germany. By the start of World War II he was commissioned a Fregattenkapitän (frigate captain).

Bey led the 4th Destroyer Flotilla, consisting of the destroyers Z11 Bernd von Arnim, Z12 Erich Giese and Z13 Erich Koellner, as part of Kommodore Friedrich Bonte's force that carried General Eduard Dietl's mountain troops for the occupation of Narvik during the German invasion of Norway on 9 April 1940. In the following Battles of Narvik on 10 April and 13 April, Bey distinguished himself by leading a small group of destroyers in a brave though doomed action against a superior Royal Navy force that included the battleship .
  
Bey was awarded with the Knight's Cross of the Iron Cross on 9 May 1940. The next day he was promoted to Captain and appointed commander of the German destroyer force (Führer der Zerstörer), succeeding Commodore Bonte, who had been killed on 10 April in the first Battle of Narvik. Bey then commanded the destroyer screen protecting the ships of the Brest Group (Scharnhorst, Gneisenau, Prinz Eugen) during Operation Cerberus (the “Channel Dash”) in February 1942. Of the three, Scharnhorst suffered extensive damage, having struck a naval mine laid off the Dover Straits.

Battle of the North Cape
Promoted to Konteradmiral (Rear Admiral), on 1 March 1943, Bey on 26 December led a task force consisting of the battleship Scharnhorst and the destroyers Z29, Z30, Z33, Z34 and Z38 out of Alta Fjord in Operation Ostfront. The first and only surface sortie ordered by Grand Admiral Karl Dönitz, Bey's objective was to intercept the Allied Convoy JW 55B en route to Murmansk.

Bey's initial force of Scharnhorst and five destroyers was superior to the convoy's escorting British cruisers and destroyers in terms of firepower. However, Bey's flagship was outmatched by Admiral Bruce Fraser's battleship  which led the British Home Fleet fleet shadowing the convoy. Scharnhorst was expected to use her speed to avoid an engagement with the Duke of York.

Poor weather, heavy seas and inadequate Luftwaffe reconnaissance prevented Bey from initially locating the convoy, so he detached his destroyers to fan out and assist in the search. However, the storm meant that Bey's destroyers ended up playing no part in the battle. Bey in the Scharnhorst managed to locate the convoy, but in the first engagement of the ensuing Battle of North Cape, while trading fire with the British convoy's screening cruisers, Scharnhorsts radar was destroyed, rendering her more or less blind during the long winter night. Scharnhorst was then caught by the more powerful Duke of York and suffered critical damage before being sunk after several torpedo hits from destroyers. Of Scharnhorsts crew of 1,968, Royal Navy vessels fished 36 men alive from the icy sea, not one of them an officer.

Awards 

 Clasp to the Iron Cross (1939), 2nd Class (16 October 1939)
 Iron Cross (1939), 1st Class (20 November 1939)
 Knight's Cross of the Iron Cross on 9 May 1940 as Kapitän zur See and chief of the 4. Zerstörer-Flottille

References

Citations

Bibliography

 
 
 Claasen, A.R.A.: Hitler's Northern War: The Luftwaffe’s Ill-Fated Campaign, 1940–1945. Lawrence: University Press of Kansas, 2001.  pp. 92–93, 230–232
 
 

1898 births
1943 deaths
20th-century Freikorps personnel
Military personnel from Hamburg
Counter admirals of the Kriegsmarine
Kriegsmarine personnel killed in World War II
Recipients of the Knight's Cross of the Iron Cross
Recipients of the clasp to the Iron Cross, 2nd class
Imperial German Navy personnel of World War I
Reichsmarine personnel
People lost at sea